Oriolo Romano  Observatory  is an amateur astronomical observatory in Oriolo Romano, Viterbo, Italy. Built in 2007, the observatory has a Celestron 8" Schmidt-Cassegrain F/10 telescope. The observatory was designed to be fully robotic, uses a QSI WS40 CCD camera with clear filter for data acquisition. The observatory is only used for astronomical research and educational outreach. Website contains a guide to universities in the United States and in Italy specialized in physics, astrophysics and astronomy.

In addition to the "orioloromano observatory" being an astronomical observatory, it also functions as a local weather station with webcam always on line. The weather station's main purpose is to provide data for planning observing sessions by gathering information about the condition inside and outside the observatory.
Conditions at the observatory are monitored and logged by a weather station. The station provides indoor and outdoor temperature as well as barometric pressure, humidity, rainfall, wind speed, direction and dew point. The data is reported real time, as well as logged. The station is configured to log and upload data to this website in 15-minute intervals. This data is also made available to forecasters, pilots, ships or anyone who needs it.

See also
 List of astronomical observatories

References

Buildings and structures in Lazio
Astronomical observatories in Italy
Buildings and structures completed in 2007